The Billboard Hot 100 is a chart that ranks the best-performing songs of the United States. Its data, published by Billboard magazine and compiled by Nielsen SoundScan, is based collectively on each single's weekly physical and digital sales, as well as airplay. In 2011, 14 singles claimed the top spot in 53 issues of the magazine, one of which, singer Katy Perry's "Firework" started its peak position in late 2010.

In 2011, nine acts achieved their first US number-one single, either as a lead artist or a featured guest: Wiz Khalifa, Adele, Pitbull, Afrojack, Nayer, LMFAO, Lauren Bennett, GoonRock and Calvin Harris. Six collaboration singles topped the chart. Pop singers Adele, Britney Spears, Katy Perry and Rihanna each earned two number-one songs during the year. 
One of Adele's songs, "Rolling in the Deep", was the best-performing single of 2011, topping the Billboard Year-End Hot 100. She became the fourth solo female to have multiple songs spend at least five weeks each at number one in one calendar year.

Rihanna's "We Found Love" was the longest-running single of the year, having topped the chart for eight consecutive weeks in 2011 and two additional weeks in 2012. It became only the eleventh single by a female solo artist to have spent at least ten weeks at number-one in the chart's history. Adele's "Rolling In the Deep" stayed at number one for seven consecutive weeks, while Lady Gaga's "Born This Way"—the 1,000th number-one single of the Hot 100—and LMFAO's "Party Rock Anthem" topped the chart for six consecutive weeks. Perry's "E.T." and Adele's "Someone Like You" each spent five weeks at the number-one spot.

Chart history

Number-one artists

See also
2011 in music
List of Billboard Hot 100 top 10 singles in 2011

Notes
 Perry had three number-one singles on the chart in 2011. However, "Firework" is excluded from the count, because it previously topped the chart in 2010.

References

External links
Hot 100 chart at Billboard

United States Hot 100
2011
Hot 100 number-one singles